Eduard Jenay was an Austrian chess master.

Jenay was a Viennese liberal who played at Café bei Neuner in der Plankengassecafé, while conservatives and military officers would never enter it in the 1840s.

He lost matches to Adolf Anderssen (3.5 : 4.5) at London 1851, and Ignatz von Kolisch (1 : 7) at Vienna 1859, and drew with Wilhelm Steinitz (2 : 2) at Vienna 1860. He took second, behind Carl Hamppe and ahead of Steinitz, at Vienna (Wiener Schachgesellschaft) 1859.

References

Austrian chess players
Year of death missing
Year of birth missing
Game players from Vienna